Eastern Condors is a 1987 Hong Kong action film directed by Sammo Hung, who also starred in the lead role. The film co-stars Yuen Biao, Joyce Godenzi, Yuen Wah, Lam Ching-ying, Yuen Woo-ping, Corey Yuen and Billy Chow. The film was released in Hong Kong on 9 July 1987.

Plot
Lieutenant Colonel Lam is a Hong Kong-American army officer given a top-secret mission by the US military. The mission entails entering Vietnam to destroy an old American bunker filled with missiles before the Viet Cong can get to them.

Due to the dangerous nature of the mission, a group of 12 Chinese American convicts are selected to accompany him, led by Tung Ming-sun. Survivors are promised a pardon, U.S. citizenship and $200,000 each. After a brief training session they are dropped into Vietnam. During the jump, Lam learns too late that the mission has been aborted. One of the convicts miscounts when to pull his parachute and dies during the landing.

Once in enemy territory, they are met by 3 Cambodian guerillas and take refuge in a small town. There they meet Rat Chieh (aka Chieh Man-yeh), and his mentally ill "Uncle", Yeung-Lung. Due to a request by Colonel Yeung who died in a plane explosion off-screen, the commandos extract Yeung-Lung and a reluctant Rat who is forced to tag along with the convicts.

Later, the squad is captured and incarcerated in a POW camp, where the prisoners are forced to play Russian roulette in a similar manner to the film The Deer Hunter. After escaping, Yeung-Lung is revealed to have been faking being mentally-ill out of protection and reveals that one of the Cambodian guerrillas is a traitor. The Cambodians execute the traitor after she is revealed by Rat.

With the Vietnamese military in pursuit, they are able to reach the bunker, but the convicts suffer several casualties during the journey. In the bunker Lam orders the convicts to destroy the missiles but is wounded by the Cambodian guerilla leader who wants the missiles for themselves to destroy the Vietnamese and in the process accidentally shoots Yeung-Lung dead. After a brief standoff, the Vietnamese enter the bunker forcing Tung, Rat, Lam, the Cambodians and the remaining convicts to briefly team up and fight the Vietnamese general and his elite soldiers.

During the final battle, the group manages to kill many of the Vietnamese general's elite soldiers but Lam, the Cambodians and most of the convicts are killed in the process. The only survivors are Tung, Rat and Dai Hoi another convict helping them throughout the journey but was tempted to leave several times due to not being told the true nature of the mission. Rat attempts to fight the General but is knocked out in the process. Tung fights and manages to defeat the Giggling General and finishes him by shoving a grenade in the generals mouth.

Tung, Rat and Dai Hoi manage to destroy the missiles and escape the bunker through an underground tunnel where they are rescued by a helicopter presumably flown by the Americans out of Vietnam.

Cast
 Sammo Hung as Tung Ming-sun
 Yuen Biao as "Rat" / Chieh Man-yeh  
 Haing S. Ngor as Lung Yeung 
 Joyce Godenzi as Cambodian Guerrilla Girl Leader 
 Chui Man-yan as Cambodian Guerrilla Girl #2
 Ha Chi-chun as Lau Shun Ying / Cambodian Guerrilla Girl #3
 Lam Ching-ying as Lieutenant Colonel Lam
 Melvin Wong as Colonel Yang Yeung
 Charlie Chin as Szeto Chin 
 Cheung Kwok-keung as Ching Dai-kong
 Billy Lau as Ching Dai-Hoi
 Yuen Woo-ping as Grandpa Yun Yen-hoy
 Corey Yuen as Judy Wu
 Peter Chan as Ma Puk-kau / Potato Onion Head
 Chin Kar-lok as Nguyen Siu-tran
 Hsiao Ho as Phan ManlLung
 Lau Chau-sang as Stuttering Keung 
 Yuen Wah as Vietnamese Giggling General 
 Yasuaki Kurata as General's elite soldier 
 Dick Wei as General's elite soldier 
 Billy Chow as General's elite soldier
 Ng Min-kan as General's elite soldier
 James Tien as Village Thug / Angry Customer
 Phillip Ko as Vietnamese Corporal Soldier 
 Wu Ma as Vietnamese Corporal Officer 
 Kenny Ho as Col Young's commando
 Max Mok as Col Young's commando
 Chung Fat as Col Young's commando
 Michael Miu as Col Young's commando
 Kent Tong as Col Young's commando
 Ben Lam as Col Young's commando
 Andy Dai as Col Young's commando
 Danny Poon as Col Young's commando
 Chris Li as Col Young's commando
 Wan Chi-keung as Col Young's commando

Production
The ensemble of convict soldiers in the film is reminiscent of similar squads in American action war films like The Dirty Dozen.
Hung believed his normal size and body shape, whilst suited to his comedic characters in his other films, would be inappropriate for a soldier. In order to get into shape for the lead role, Hung lost 30 pounds in 3 months by surviving on a diet of nothing but chicken and rice. Although set in Vietnam, the most of the film was shot in the Philippines. The scenes set in the United States were actually filmed in Canada.

Theme song
A Condor's Mission (禿鷹使命)
Composer: Jonathan Lee
Lyricist: Lin Xi
Singer: Sammo Hung, Yuen Biao, Prudence Liew, Susanne Ho, Joyce Godenzi, Billy Lau, Rosanne Lui, Woo Kin-chung, Fundamental

Accolades

Home media
On 2 April 2001, a Region 2 DVD was released by Hong Kong Legends in the United Kingdom.

See also
Sammo Hung filmography
List of Hong Kong films
Yuen Biao filmography

References

External links
 
 

1987 films
1987 action films
1987 martial arts films
1980s war films
1980s Cantonese-language films
Films directed by Sammo Hung
Films set in 1976
Films set in the United States
Films set in Vietnam
Films shot in Canada
Films shot in the Philippines
Golden Harvest films
Hong Kong action films
Hong Kong martial arts films
War adventure films
Vietnam War films
1980s Hong Kong films
Films set in bunkers